The Angola national futsal team is controlled by the Angolan Football Federation, the governing body for futsal in Angola and represents the country in international futsal competitions.

Results and fixtures

The following is a list of match results in the last 12 months, as well as any future matches that have been scheduled.

Legend

2021

Competitive record

FIFA Futsal World Cup

Africa Futsal Cup of Nations
Africa Futsal Cup of Nations record
1996–2004 – Did not enter
2008 – 1st round
2011 – Cancelled
2016 – 1st round
2020 –  3rd place

Grand Prix de Futsal
2005 – Did not enter
2006 – Did not enter
2007 – 13th place
2008 – 13th place
2009 – 16th place
2010 – Did not enter
2011 – 11th place
2013 – Did not enter
2014 – Did not enter
2015 – 7th place
2018 – Did not enter

Futsal Mundialito
1994 – Did not enter
1995 – Did not enter
1996 – Did not enter
1998 – Did not enter
2001 – Did not enter
2002 – Did not enter
2006 –  3rd place
2007 – 6th place
2008 –  3rd place

References

External links
Angola FA

Angola
National sports teams of Angola
Futsal in Angola